Musellifer is a genus of gastrotrichs belonging to the family Muselliferidae.

The species of this genus are found in Northern America.

Species:

Musellifer delamarei 
Musellifer profundus 
Musellifer reichardti 
Musellifer sublitoralis 
Musellifer tridentatus

References

Gastrotricha